"Welcome to Republic City" is the first episode of the Nickelodeon series The Legend of Korra. The series premiered online on March 24, 2012 and on Nickelodeon on April 14, 2012, as a special movie sequel to the original series, Avatar: The Last Airbender.

The setting of the second series has changed dramatically from the first series. Most events take place in a city known as Republic City, which is a "steampunk" style city. Most notably, the access to electricity in the new series substantiates the passing of time between the two series.

Plot
57 years after the end of the Hundred Year War, three members of the White Lotus respond to claims from the Southern Water Tribe of a child as the Avatar by meeting 4-year-old Korra, the reincarnation of Aang who is already capable of bending water, earth, and fire.

13 years later, a now 17-year-old Korra has conquered the art and skill of waterbending, earthbending, and firebending in the Fortress—a place meant to teach the Avatar the elements away from harm—but has yet to learn airbending. Her waterbending master, Katara, who is now an old woman (with three grown children fathered by the deceased Avatar Aang), lets Korra go to Republic City after Katara's youngest son Tenzin is not able to teach Korra airbending at the fortress (due to being a member of the council of the United Republic) and seeing Korra frustrated by her isolation. Korra travels with her Polar bear dog, Naga, to Republic City, where she gets into a fight with a group of men who were going to rob an old man in the city. After being arrested for the resulting collateral damage, she meets Chief Lin Beifong, Toph‘s daughter, who is unhappy at Korra's arrival seeing it as a danger to the city. However, Tenzin bails her out of jail, preparing to send her back to the South Pole until he realizes that the Avatar is a vital part of the idea of Republic City, thus allowing her to stay and train in airbending. Meanwhile, Amon, leader of an anti-bender equalist group, learns of Korra's arrival, and tells his followers that he will have to accelerate his plans.

Reception

The Legend of Korra received positive critical reviews. The premiere averaged 4.5 million viewers ranking it as basic cable's number-one kids’ show and top animated program for the week with total viewers. The Legend of Korra also ranks as the network's most-watched animated series premiere in three years.

References

External links
 
 Book 1, Ep 1: "Welcome to Republic City" at Nickelodeon

The Legend of Korra episodes
2012 American television episodes
American television series premieres
Television films as pilots
Films directed by Joaquim Dos Santos